Pewsham is a small village and former civil parish just south-east of the town of Chippenham on the A4 national route towards Calne in Wiltshire, southwestern England.

Description 
Although signposted as Pewsham on the main road at both ends, the original settlement does not appear on Ordnance Survey maps, which instead apply the name to the southeastern outskirts of Chippenham. Spread along the road are a small business centre called Forest Gate, a car dealership and a pub named The Pewsham. Set back behind the pub is Pewsham House, built in red brick in 1892; it was designed in 17th-century style by the Wiltshire architect Charles Ponting.

The Wilts & Berks Canal – abandoned in 1914 but under restoration since the 1990s – passed close to the village, with the three Pewsham Locks to the south and a road bridge at the main road. The Cocklemore Brook drains the farmland south of the A4, and flows into the Avon near Pewsham Locks.

The closest neighbouring village is Derry Hill, in particular the 'Old Derry Hill' area at the foot of the hill, just beyond the pub.

In the late 1980s and early 1990s, when large housing developments spread across several towns, Pewsham was the name given to Chippenham's new residential district in the south-east of the town. The diverted A4 which formed the district's perimeter road was named Pewsham Way.

Forest and parishes 
There was a royal forest in the area from the 13th century, sometimes called Chippenham forest, at other times Pewsham and Bowood forest.

Pewsham was one of several areas that in 1842 formed the ecclesiastical parish for the newly consecrated Christ Church at Derry Hill; until then Pewsham was extra-parochial, i.e. outside any parish, presumably because it had been largely uninhabited woodland or wood-pasture.

The population of the Pewsham extra-parochial area peaked at 480 in 1841. It was made a civil parish in 1858, at the same time as many other extra-parochial places. In 1884 Nethermore to the south-east (formerly a detached tithing of Chippenham, with nine houses) was added to the parish, as was an area to the south; thus the parish extended as far south as the edges of the Lackham House and Bowden Park estates.

The parish was enlarged further in 1934, taking an area from Chippenham Without, so that it extended northwards beyond Tytherton Lucas; the area transferred had a population of 260 at the 1931 census. Finally, Pewsham parish was abolished in 1984, its built-up area transferred to Chippenham parish and the rural remainder to Calne Without.

Council ward 
Pewsham electoral division elects one member of Wiltshire Council, the unitary authority. It covers the southeastern extremity of Chippenham's built-up area, and the rural area to the south which is bounded by the river and the canal.

References

External links

Former civil parishes in Wiltshire
Villages in Wiltshire
Calne Without
Chippenham